is a series of rock formations along the sea cliffs on the west coast of Shimokita Peninsula at the entrance to Mutsu Bay in far northern Japan. These rock formations were designed a Natural Monument of Aomori Prefecture in 1934, and became further protected from April 23, 1941 as a nationally designated Place of Scenic Beauty and Natural Monument, From 1968, the rock formations were also located within the borders of the Shimokita Hantō Quasi-National Park.  In 1975, the surrounding waters were designated as Hotokegaura Marine Park.

Overview
Individual features have been named for figures in Buddhist theology, and were popularised by the poet and mountaineer Omachi Keigetsu (1869-1925) after his visit in September 1922, although the area had been well-known since the Edo period at part of the pilgrimage route to Mount Osore. 

The area is difficult to reach overland despite its proximity to Japan National Route 338, and tourist boats depart from the village of Sai or the city of Mutsu from April through October. In 1991, a small jetty was constructed for the purpose of berthing a sightseeing boat

See also
Shimokita Hantō Quasi-National Park
Jōdogahama
 List of Places of Scenic Beauty of Japan (Aomori)

Gallery

References
 Teikoku's Complete Atlas of Japan, Teikoku-Shoin Co., Ltd. Tokyo 1990,

External links

Hotokegaura homepage 
Aomori Prefectural home page
Japan National Tourism Organization home page
Sai Village Tourism Association

Notes

Tourist attractions in Aomori Prefecture
Geography of Aomori Prefecture
Sai, Aomori
Places of Scenic Beauty
Natural monuments of Japan
IUCN Category III